Jacek Jan Kuroń (3 March 1934 – 17 June 2004) was one of the democratic leaders of opposition in the People's Republic of Poland. He was widely known as the "godfather of the Polish opposition," not unlike Václav Havel in Czechoslovakia. Kuroń was a prominent Polish social and political figure known for his efforts at reforming societies under the control of the Soviet Union.  As an educator and historian, he first postulated the concept of a de-centered movement that would question the totalitarian system and its personality cult. Kuroń started out as an activist of the Polish Scouting Association trying to educate young people that would take charge of the future; he later co-founded with Antoni Macierewicz the Workers' Defence Committee or KOR, a major dissident organization that was superseded by Solidarity in August 1980. After the changes in independent Poland, he ran for president supported by the likes of Jan Karski and served twice as Minister of Labour and Social Policy. Kuroń was the father of chef Maciej Kuroń.

Biography
Kuroń was born in 1934, in Lwów (now Lviv, Ukraine), into a family that supported the Polish Socialist Party (PPS). In 1949, he became a member of the Communist Association of the Polish Youth (ZMP). From 1952, he worked as a full-time employee in the capital scout section affiliated with the Association of the Polish Youth. The same year, he joined the Polish United Workers' Party (PZPR). Then, he engaged in social movements making attempts to introduce more rights for the workers. After the political transformation and introduction of democracy to Poland, Kuroń became a Minister of Labor and Social Policy. After a long illness, Kuroń died in 2004. His funeral was held on 26 June 2004. He was buried in the Avenue of the Meritious in the Powązki Cemetery in Warsaw. The ceremony was attended by close friends, supporters, Polish youth and children. Although Kuroń was an atheist, representatives of all major religious communities came to display their respect to the renowned humanitarian.

Early social and political activities
In 1955 the Crooked Circle Club was established. Jacek Kuroń and Karol Modzelewski were among the most prominent members of the club. 
In 1957 Kuroń graduated from the Faculty of History at the University of Warsaw. In 1964, together with Karol Modzelewski, he wrote The Open Letter to the Party. In this letter he criticized a new ruling and bureaucratic class. He suggested replacing the existing system with workers' democracy, including organizing a referendum according to which major decisions concerning a distribution of national income would be made. The immediate aim was to have a consent of all workers to make decisions on economic plans. Kuroń's critique was closely related to the ideas of Marxism and Trotskyism. In 1965, he was sentenced to three years in prison for writing The Open Letter to the Party. Kuroń defiantly sang "The Internationale" in court. Imprisoned in Wronki Prison, he was released in 1967, and soon arrested again. In 1968 Kuroń was sentenced to three and a half years in prison for organizing student strikes during March Events. In 1975, he helped to organize a protest against the passage of amendments to the Constitution of the People's Republic of Poland. Following a government crackdown on strikes, and the jailing of striking workers, in June 1976, Kuroń co-founded with Antoni Macierewicz KOR, a worker's defense committee and civil organization that helped pave the way for Solidarność. The Coastal Free Trade Union WZZ, the cradle of Solidarity, was established on April 29, 1978 after Krzysztof Wyszkowski convinced Kuron that workers needed their own voice.

During the strikes of July and August 1980, Kuroń organized an information network for workers across the country. Soon after the Gdansk shipyard occupation began in August 1980, Kuron was imprisoned again, but released with other dissidents, including Adam Michnik, before the signing of the Gdansk agreement of 31 August 1980, conceding the right to form independent unions. In September 1980, he became an adviser for the Founding Committee of the Solidarność. By this time he had changed from the ideas in "An Open Letter to the Party" of revolution and worker's organization taking over society to one of 'self limiting revolution.' On 13 December 1981 the Martial Law was introduced in Poland, and his activities were curtailed. In 1982, accused of attempts to destroy the political system, Kuroń was arrested. Two years later he was pardoned and released from prison.

As a member of the opposition Kuroń used pseudonyms – Maciej Gajka and Elżbieta Grażyna Borucka, or EGB.

Transformation and politics in the 1990s
By 1988 the authorities began serious talks with the opposition. Polish Round Table Talks took place in Warsaw, Poland from 6 February to 4 April 1989. The opposition representation included Jacek Kuroń. The election of 4 June 1989 brought a landslide victory to Solidarność: 99% of the seats in the Senate and allowable maximum number of seats in Sejm (35% of the total). The 65-35 division was soon abolished as well, which allowed the first truly free Sejm elections.

In 1989-1990 and 1992-1993 Kuroń was a Minister of Labor and Social Policy. From 1989 to 2001 he was a member of the Polish Parliament. He belonged to the following parties: Citizen Parliamentary Club (OKP), Union of Democracy (UD), Union of Freedom (UW). In the 1995 elections Kuroń ran for the office of president of the Republic of Poland. With support of 9.2%, Kuroń came third.

Awards
Kuroń's work was recognized not only in Poland but also in a number of other European countries. In 1998 he was awarded a Polish Order of the White Eagle, French Legion of Honour, German Federal Cross of Merit, Ukrainian Order of Yaroslav the Wise, Lithuanian Order of the Lithuanian Grand Duke Gediminas. On the 4 April 2001 Kuroń became the 645th Knight of the Order of Smile. This award is given to honorable adults who made a considerable contribution to children's happiness and wellbeing. The same award was given to the 14th Dalai Lama, a friend of Jacek Kuroń.

Social engagement
In 2000 Kuroń and his wife Danuta Kuroń founded the Jan Józef Lipski Common University in Teremiski. He subsequently became the first dean of the informal university.

In the last years of his life Kuroń became very critical about the social and economical results of the 1989 transformation. Among other books and press articles, two of his papers are worthy of  attention: "Action" and "Republic for my Grandchildren."  In the latter, Kuroń highly criticized neoliberalism, which deepens social divisions and alienation of the political class. Kuroń opted for social movements and education. His last public speech in April 2004 was addressed to alterglobalists, who were protesting against the World Economic Forum held in Warsaw. He said "It is you, my Dear Friends, who have to perform the actions which contemporary political elites cannot perform: who have to create new concepts of social cooperation, implement ideals of freedom, equality, and social justice."

Anecdotes
The Polish unemployment benefit is colloquially referred to by Poles as the kuroniówka (literally "Kuroń's soup") in tribute to Jacek Kuroń's legacy as Minister for Social Policy.

Jacek Kuroń was a proud owner of a yellow thermos bottle. Many people speculated about its content. Some claimed it contained whisky. They reached this conclusion, because Kuroń, unlike other politicians, used to be very straightforward and sincere. The riddle of the yellow thermos was uncovered in the book Urban Legends by Mark Barber and Wojciech Orliński. Orliński happened to have an opportunity to taste the content of the thermos. To his great surprise, the liquid to which Kuroń was addicted was not an alcoholic beverage, but an extremely strong tea. The yellow thermos accompanied Kuroń on his last journey.

Bibliography
 An Open Letter to the Party - A Revolutionary Socialist Manifesto (with Karol Modzelewski), London: Pluto Press, 1969 (English Translation)
 How to Get Out of a Dead-End Situation Telos 51 (Spring 1982). New York: Telos Press.
 Text of an "List Otwarty Do Partii" ("Open Letter to Party") 
 Recycling of Ideas, 2006-06-27.
 Anna Bikont, Joanna Szczęsna. "Jacek Kuroń, 1934-2004", 2006-09-18 (accessed 2006-09-25).
 Soviet communism and the socialist vision, Julius Jacobson (ed.) Transaction Publishers, 1972; p. 242-282. (American translation of "An Open Letter to the Party" pp. 242–282)
 Solidarność, the missing link: a new edition of Poland's classic revolutionary socialist manifesto: Kuron and Modzelewski's open letter to the Party. London: Bookmarks, 1982. (British translation with useful introduction by Colin Barker.)

References

Further reading
 Frankel, Benjamin. The Cold War 1945-1991. Vol. 2, Leaders and other important figures in the Soviet Union, Eastern Europe, China and the Third World (1992) pp 189–90.
 Lepak, Keith John. Prelude to solidarity: Poland and the politics of the Gierek Regime (Columbia University Press, 1988).

External links

  
 Jacek Kuroń tells his life story at Web of Stories (video)
  “Obituary: Jacek Kuron.” Andy Zebrowski, Socialist Review, July 2004.
 “Jacek Kuron, of Solidarity, Dies at 70.” Michael T. Kaufman, New York Times, June 18, 2004.
Jacek Kuroń: Ties with Culture

1934 births
2004 deaths
Members of the Workers' Defence Committee
Politicians from Lviv
People from Lwów Voivodeship
Burials at Powązki Cemetery
Polish atheists
Polish Scouts and Guides
University of Warsaw alumni
20th-century Polish historians
Polish male non-fiction writers
Solidarity (Polish trade union) activists
Government ministers of Poland
Candidates in the 1995 Polish presidential election
Commanders Crosses of the Order of Merit of the Federal Republic of Germany
Recipients of the Order of the Lithuanian Grand Duke Gediminas
Members of the Polish Sejm 1991–1993
Members of the Polish Sejm 1993–1997
Members of the Polish Sejm 1997–2001
Polish United Workers' Party members
Polish dissidents
Polish Round Table Talks participants